Acanthogethes fuscus is a species of pollen beetle in the family Nitidulidae. It is found in Africa, Europe and Northern Asia (excluding China), and North America.

References

Further reading

 

Nitidulidae
Articles created by Qbugbot
Beetles described in 1790